

Wilhelm Meendsen-Bohlken  (25 June 1897 – 20 August 1985) was a Vizeadmiral with the Kriegsmarine during World War II. He was a recipient of the Knight's Cross of the Iron Cross of Nazi Germany. From July 1944 to May 1945 he served as the final fleet commander of the Kriegsmarine.

Awards
 Iron Cross (1914)  2nd Class (1 July 1916) & 1st Class (30 December 1919)
 U-boat War Badge (1914) (October 1918)

 Clasp to the Iron Cross (1939)  2nd Class (10 June 1942) & 1st Class (30 August 1942)
 Knight's Cross of the Iron Cross on 15 May 1944 as Konteradmiral and Befehlshaber der deutsches Marinekommandos in Italien (Commander-in-chief of the German Naval Commando in Italy)

References

 
 

1897 births
1964 deaths
Vice admirals of the Kriegsmarine
Recipients of the clasp to the Iron Cross, 1st class
Recipients of the Gold German Cross
Recipients of the Knight's Cross of the Iron Cross
Imperial German Navy personnel of World War I
Reichsmarine personnel
People from Oldenburg (state)
People from Brake, Lower Saxony
Military personnel from Lower Saxony